Edgar Everett Martin (July 6, 1898 – August 31, 1960), known to his family and friends as Abe Martin, was an American cartoonist, who kept his comic strip, Boots and Her Buddies, running for decades, eventually reaching an audience of 60 million readers.

Biography 
Born in Indianapolis, Indiana, the youth moved with his family to Nashville, Tennessee and then to Monmouth, Illinois where his father, George Martin, was a Monmouth College biology professor. As a Monmouth College freshman, he drew frogs, grasshoppers and salamanders in his father's biology classes.

He met and married Mary Armsby while attending Monmouth College. (Two of their three daughters also went to Monmouth.) Martin left his junior year to study at the Chicago Academy of Fine Arts, joining Newspaper Enterprise Association in 1921 as a cartoonist.

Boots and Her Buddies
While working in NEA's art department, Martin experimented with several strips: Efficiency Ed, Fables of 1921, Taken from Life and Girls, the strip which introduced Boots. In 1924, NEA was looking for a girl strip, and several artists who had previously submitted strips were asked to resubmit them. Martin's sample was unsigned. When an editor examined Martin's strip and asked, "How soon can we get this artist?", the art director responded, "In one minute. He works here." Thus, Girls became Boots and Her Buddies on February 18, 1924, although some newspapers continued to use the first title. Syndicated by NEA, it appeared in 500 newspapers during the 1940s, with about half that carrying the Sunday strip. In the post-WWII years, the figure climbed to 700 newspapers.

With the strip's emphasis on fashion and beauty, Martin attended style shows and constantly thumbed through fashion magazines to study trends and keep Boots in current fashions. In addition to the strip, Martin drew promotional paper dolls in occasional newspaper cartoon panels displaying Boots and her fashionable outfits. Promoted as an expert of female beauty, Martin was often invited to judge beauty contests. In the early days, the strip had a large following among students at colleges and high schools, with the result that Martin sometimes made personal appearances at proms.

Interviewed in 1952, Martin revealed the strip's background and his attitude toward the characters:

Martin's assistant Les Carroll eventually took over the Sunday strip, but Martin continued to draw the daily strip. The character of Billy, Boots' brother, was based on Martin himself.

Later life and death 
Martin, who enjoyed antique collecting and golf, lived at 305 North Second Street in Monmouth. He and his family moved to Clearwater, Florida in 1940. When he died in Clearwater on August 30, 1960, he was survived by his widow, three daughters and five grandchildren.

Further reading
"'Boots' Goes to Yale.'" Jackson Daily News, Jackson, Mississippi, February or March 1939.
"Where Comics Come From." Unidentified newspaper article.
"'Boots' Has 25th Anniversary, as Creator Edgar E. Martin, Clearwater, Wins Plaudits." The Sun, February 15, 1949.
"Get a 'Flexible Larynx' to Woo the Gals, Advises Atlanta Charm Academy." Tampa Sunday Tribune, July 30, 1950?
"'Boots and Her Buddies' Speak from Brain of Local Student." Columbia Daily Tribune, 1950.
Falk, Lee. "A Short History of the Comic Strip" (Boots and Her Buddies, p. 4) reprint for Diamond Jubilee of Newspaper Comics April 1971-April 1972.

References

1898 births
1960 deaths
American comic strip cartoonists
Monmouth College alumni